Hajjiabad (also Romanized as Ḩājjīābād and Ḩājīābād; also known as Haji Abad Darroofaraman and Ḩājjīābād-e Darūfarāmān) is a village in Dorudfaraman Rural District, in the Central District of Kermanshah County, Kermanshah Province, Iran. At the 2006 census, its population was 416, in 107 families.

References 

Populated places in Kermanshah County